Halleberg is a table mountain by lake Vänern in Vänersborg Municipality, Västergötland, Sweden.

The northern part of Halleberg called Hallesnipen.

Geology 

Halleberg consists of Cambrian, Ordovician and Permian rocks. The Palaeozoic rocks are deposited directly on the crystalline peneplain bedrock, which in this range consists of göta granite. The Cambrian sedimentary rocks are sandstone and alum shale. The Ordovician is represented by a calcareous slate. During the Permian it was pushed into diabase which lays as a protective cover and thus protect the mountain from erosion. The diabase on Västgötabergen known locally for staircases.

Economic Geology 
Anthraconite, alum shale and diabase has previously been mined in several places on the mountain.

Nature 
Around the food of the Halleberg are elongated scree of large stacked, sharp-edged boulders. In a few places, there are so-called steps, where there are roads or paths up the mountain. The vegetation on the mountain plateau is dominated by spruce and pine, and the expanse of bog, while on scree lower parts are more species. In contrast to Hunneberg, on Halleberg there is simply lake Hallsjön, three-kilometer long but narrow.

On Halleberg is the Ecopark Halle-Hunneberg (comprising the Halle- och Hunnebergs platåers naturreservat and the Halle- och Hunnebergs branters naturreservat).

Halleberg Ancient Fortress 
Halleberg is also Scandinavia's largest hillfort (about ). It is almost completely naturally fortified by the mountain's steep slopes, large stone ramparts being primarily at the Storgårdsklev steps in the southwest. Small ramparts have in passable gaps, for example at the Lilleskog and Björkås trappa staircase. The hill fort was built during the Migration Period of the 3rd-4th centuries. It was a refuge during the Swedish-Danish wars of the 15th-17th centuries, for example during the Gyldenløve War in 1676, but also during Gustav III's Russian War of 1788. The Danes only managed to conquer the castle once, in 1612. During the Basse War (Bassefejden in Swedish) of 1490–1510, Halleberg was besieged for seven years.

The place name (in about 1325 Haal), had previously only a hall, including a 'rock face' entrance hall, a 'cliff' or similar.

Halleberg in mythology 

Halleberg is considered by some to be the location of Valhalla. Part of the mountain is still called Häcklan. One of Odin's name was Häcklaman.

See also 
 Hunneberg

External links 
Ecopark Halle-Hunneberg

Mountains of Sweden
Landforms of Västra Götaland County
Vänersborg Municipality